Dominick Geoffrey Edward Browne, 4th Baron Oranmore and Browne, 2nd Baron Mereworth (21 October 1901 – 7 August 2002), was a British peer and legislator.

Biography 
He was born into an Anglo-Irish aristocratic family as The Hon. Dominick Geoffrey Edward Browne in 1901, the eldest son of The 3rd Baron Oranmore and Browne and Lady Olwen Verena Ponsonby, daughter of The 8th Earl of Bessborough. He was educated at Eton and Christ Church, Oxford before joining the Grenadier Guards, serving 1921-22 as a second lieutenant.

In 1927, he succeeded his father and took his seat in the House of Lords as Baron Mereworth, a title in the Peerage of the United Kingdom (the older Barony of Oranmore and Browne, in the Peerage of Ireland, did not entitle its bearer to a seat in the Lords), although he primarily used his Irish title. He sat in the House of Lords for 72 years, the longest by any peer up to that time, and during that time was one of the few peers to have never spoken in the House.

In 1930, the English residence of the Browne family, Mereworth Castle, was sold and he went to live in his Irish residence, Castle MacGarrett, just outside Claremorris in County Mayo. Castle MacGarrett, its  and 150 employees gave him the chance to breed racehorses and farm on a large scale. Lord Oranmore and Browne was also an aviator.

In 1939, Oranmore and Browne tried to rejoin the British Army, but he was told that, at 38, he would be more useful concentrating on farming; as a result, his war service was in neutral Ireland with the Irish reserve force, the Local Defence Force, in County Mayo.

In the early 1950s, the castle was acquired by the Irish Government's Irish Land Commission and turned into a nursing home. Lord Oranmore and Browne went to live in London.

Personal life 
Lord Oranmore and Browne married three times :
 First, 1925, Mildred Helen Egerton (15 November 1903 – 1980), daughter of The Hon. Thomas Henry Frederick Egerton of the Earls of Ellesmere and Lady Bertha Anson of the Earls of Lichfield (marriage dissolved 1936).  Children from this marriage:
 The Hon. Patricia Helen Browne (born 16 Feb 1926 – 1981) 
 The Hon. Brigid Verena Browne (25 Dec 1927 – 3 Jan 1941) 
 Dominick Geoffrey Thomas Browne (born 1 Jul 1929), succeeded his father as 5th Baron Oranmore and Browne and 3rd Baron Mereworth but known as Lord Mereworth
 The Hon. Martin Michael Dominick Browne (27 Oct 1931 – 14 June 2013)
 The Hon. Judith Browne (born 23 Sep 1934)
 Second, 1936, Oonagh Guinness (22 February 1910 – 2 August 1995), daughter of Ernest Guinness and an heir to the Guinness brewery fortune (marriage dissolved 1950).  Children from this marriage:
 The Hon. Garech Domnagh Browne (25 Jun 1939 – 10 March 2018)
 An unnamed son (28 Dec 1943 – 30 Dec 1943)
 The Hon. Tara Browne (4 March 1945 – 18 December 1966), killed in a car accident
 Third, 1951, Constance Stevens (14 February 1915 – 24 September 2006), an actress with the stage name Sally Gray, famous for her roles on the stage and in various movies in the 1930s and 40s.
Lord Oranmore and Browne died in London on 7 August 2002 at the age of 100.

References

External links

Alumni of Christ Church, Oxford
Barons in the Peerage of Ireland
Barons in the Peerage of the United Kingdom
Grenadier Guards officers
British centenarians
Men centenarians
1901 births
2002 deaths
People educated at Eton College
People from London
People from County Mayo
Oranmore and Browne